The Force is a 2017 documentary film directed by Peter Nicks. The documentary describes two years of efforts by the Oakland Police Department to implement reforms against police misconduct and scandals, at a time of growing social unrest, protests demanding increased police accountability, and ongoing federal oversight. The film won the Documentary Directing Award at the 2017 Sundance Film Festival and a Golden Gate Award at the 2017 San Francisco International Film Festival.

References

External links
 
 

Black Lives Matter art
Criminal justice reform in the United States
Criticism of police brutality
Race and crime in the United States
American documentary films
Oakland Police Department
Sundance Film Festival award winners
2010s English-language films
2017 documentary films
2010s American films